Herman William Quinton (28 October 1896, in Red Cliff, Newfoundland – 2 April 1952) was a Canadian politician.

The son of Jacob Quinton and Sarah Benger, he was educated at Bishop Feild College, then worked as a school teacher from 1913 to 1914 and, afterwards, joined Sir William Coaker in the Fisherman's Union Trading Company managing various branches before becoming dry goods superintendent.

Quinton served with the Newfoundland Regiment during World War I and saw action in France and Belgium, he achieved the rank of lieutenant in 1918. He became secretary-treasurer of the Great War Veterans' Association of Newfoundland in 1924.

Following the war, he went back to the Trading Company before joining A.E. Hickman & Co. as a travelling salesman. From 1928 to 1932, Quinton was manager for an export division of the Monroe Export Co.

He married Ella Blackmore.

Quinton was elected to the Newfoundland House of Assembly in 1928 representing Bonavista and was re-elected in 1932 defeating a young Joey Smallwood. He served as minister of public works in the Newfoundland government until responsible government was suspended in 1934 in favour of a Commission of Government appointed by London. He was appointed magistrate for St. Barbe district. Following the death of Sir John Charles Puddester, he was appointed to the Commission of Government in 1947 to fill Puddester's portfolio as Commissioner of Public Health and Welfare. In this period the colony was considering whether or not to join Canada as a province and Quinton was one of only two Commissioners to support joining confederation. Following Newfoundland's entry into Canadian Confederation he was elected to the new House of Assembly representing Burgeo-LaPoile for the Liberal Party of Newfoundland and served in the new provincial government as Minister of Finance in Premier Joey Smallwood's first Cabinet.

He retired from provincial politics in 1950 and was appointed to the Senate of Canada on  24 January 1951 on the recommendation of Louis St-Laurent. He represented the senatorial division of Burgeo-Lapoile, Newfoundland as a member of the Liberal Party of Canada until his death in St. John's at the age of 55.

References

1896 births
1952 deaths
Members of the Newfoundland and Labrador House of Assembly
Canadian senators from Newfoundland and Labrador
Liberal Party of Canada senators
Bishop Feild School alumni
Members of the Newfoundland Commission of Government
Newfoundland military personnel of World War I
Government ministers of the Dominion of Newfoundland
Royal Newfoundland Regiment officers